The People's Revolutionary Movement (PRM) is a South African political party founded in November 2016 by former African National Congress councillor Nhlanhla Buthelezi in the KwaZulu-Natal province, and is known for its socially conservative views (particularly on LGBT rights).

The party contested the 2019 national and provincial elections, failing to win any seats.

Election results

National elections

|-
! Election
! Total votes
! Share of vote
! Seats 
! +/–
! Government
|-
! 2019
| 2,844
| 0.02%
| 
| –
| 
|}

Provincial elections

! rowspan=2 | Election
! colspan=2 | Eastern Cape
! colspan=2 | Free State
! colspan=2 | Gauteng
! colspan=2 | Kwazulu-Natal
! colspan=2 | Limpopo
! colspan=2 | Mpumalanga
! colspan=2 | North-West
! colspan=2 | Northern Cape
! colspan=2 | Western Cape
|-
! % !! Seats
! % !! Seats
! % !! Seats
! % !! Seats
! % !! Seats
! % !! Seats
! % !! Seats
! % !! Seats
! % !! Seats
|-
! 2019
| 0.02% || 0/63
| - || -
| - || -
| 0.07% || 0/80
| - || -
| - || -
| - || -
| - || -
| - || -
|}

References 

2016 establishments in South Africa
African National Congress breakaway groups
Political parties in South Africa
Political parties established in 2016
Conservative parties in South Africa